Emma Sarah Hutchinson (1820–1906) was a Victorian lepidopterist who authored the 1879 book Entomology and Botany as Pursuits for Ladies and published in The Entomologist's Record and Journal of Variation. She reared butterflies and moths from eggs and her work contributed to understanding of the Lepidoptera life cycle. The summer form of the Polygonia c-album butterfly species, known as the comma, is named hutchinsoni in her honour.

Early life 
Born as Emma Sarah Gill in 1820, she married Thomas Hutchinson, the vicar of Grantsfield near Kimbolton, in 1847 and spent most of her life in Herefordshire. Hutchinson's interest in butterflies and moths started when her young son captured a swallow-tailed moth.

Scientific practice 
Hutchinson devoted much of her life to the study butterflies and moths, the insect order Lepidoptera. She became known during her lifetime for her skills in rearing butterflies and moths from eggs. She bred the pinion-spotted pug moth for 31 years. Her work contributed to a better understanding of the life cycle of Lepidoptera. She corresponded with well-known entomologists such as Edward Newman, Henry Doubleday, William Buckler, and Henry Tibbats Stainton.

In the Victorian era entomology was fashionable and natural history societies were well attended. Hutchinson's 1879 book Entomology and Botany as Pursuits for Ladies went on to become a popular scientific publication. In it she encouraged women to study butterflies instead of just collecting them.

In 1881 her letter on the possible decline of the Polygonia c-album butterfly species, known as the comma, was published in The Entomologist's Record and Journal of Variation. Hutchinson had studied the habits of the comma for 50 years and put forward the thesis that its decline in Kent was due to the burning of the hop vine after harvest, destroying the larvae and pupae. Hutchinson participated in efforts to reintroduce the comma to parts of England, including Surrey, by collecting comma larvae and pupae in Herefordshire and introducing them into the wild elsewhere. But Hutchinson was convinced that these efforts were hindered by naturalists who collected adult butterflies as specimens for their collections.

Legacy 
In 1937 Hutchinson's collection of 20,000 butterflies and moths was exhibited in the Natural History Museum. Hutchinson's notebooks are held in the library of the Herford Woolhope Naturalists' Field Club.

The summer form of the Polygonia c-album butterfly species, known as the comma, is named hutchinsoni in her honour.

See also
Timeline of women in science

References

1820 births
1906 deaths
English lepidopterists
British entomologists
Women entomologists
19th-century British scientists
19th-century British women scientists
People from Herefordshire